Anthosachne sacandros is a species of true grass in the tribe Triticeae. It is endemic to the Richmond temperate forests of the Marlborough Region, New Zealand. It is a medium-size, tufted, perennial grass that is primarily coastal, but extends inland in some locations. It grows on limestone cliffs, bluffs and river terraces, from elevations of 0–900 m. It flowers from October–February, and fruits from December–May. It is distinguished from the related A. falcis by its erect growth form, long, thin, ribbed and glaucous leaf blades, and the dense hairs at the leaf blade–ligule junction. It is threatened by introduced species such as the common brushtail possum, and plants such as Lycium ferocissimum and Pinus contorta. Its isolated populations are also threatened by fire, floods and erosion.

References

Pooideae
Near threatened plants
Endemic flora of New Zealand